Igneous petrology is the study of igneous rocks—those that are formed from magma. As a branch of geology, igneous petrology is closely related to volcanology, tectonophysics, and petrology in general. The modern study of igneous rocks utilizes a number of techniques, some of them developed in the fields of chemistry, physics, or other earth sciences. Petrography, crystallography, and isotopic studies are common methods used in igneous petrology.

Methods

Determination of chemical composition
The composition of igneous rocks and minerals can be determined via a variety of methods of varying ease, cost, and complexity. The simplest method is observation of hand samples with the naked eye and/or with a hand lens. This can be used to gauge the general mineralogical composition of the rock, which gives an insight into the composition. A more precise but still relatively inexpensive way to identify minerals (and thereby the bulk chemical composition of the rock) with a petrographic microscope. These microscopes have polarizing plates, filters, and a conoscopic lens that allow the user to measure a variety of crystallographic properties. Another method for determining mineralogy is to use X-ray diffraction, in which a powdered sample is bombarded by X-rays, and the resultant spectrum of crystallographic orientations is compared to a set of standards. One of the most precise ways of determining chemical composition is by the use of an electron microprobe, in which tiny spots of materials are sampled. Electron microprobe analyses can detect both bulk composition and trace element composition.

Dating methods

The dating of igneous rocks determines when magma solidified into rock. Radiogenic isotopes are frequently used to determine the age of igneous rocks.

Potassium–argon dating

In this dating method the amount of 40Ar trapped in a rock is compared to the amount of 40K in the rock to calculate the amount of time  40K must have been decaying in the solid rock to produce all 40Ar that would have otherwise not have been present there.

Rubidium–strontium dating

The rubidium–strontium dating is based on the natural decay of 87Rb to 87Sr and the different behaviour of these elements during fractional crystallization of magma. Both Sr and Rb are found in most magmas; however, as fractional crystallization occurs, Sr will tend to be concentrated in plagioclase crystals while Rb will remain in the melt for a longer time. 87Rb decays in magma and elsewhere so that every 1.42×1011 years half of the amount has been converted into 87Sr. Knowing the decay constant and the amount of 87Rb and 87Sr in a rock it is possible to calculate the time that the 87Rb must have needed before the rock reached closure temperature to produce all 87Sr, yet considering that there was an initial 87Sr amount not produced by 87Rb in the magmatic body. Initial values of 87Sr, when the magma started fractional crystallization, might be estimated by knowing the amounts of 87Rb and 87Sr of two igneous rocks produced at different times by the same magmatic body.

Other methods
Stratigraphic principles may be useful to determine the relative age of volcanic rocks. Tephrochronology is the most common application of stratigraphic dating on volcanic rocks.

Thermobarometry methods

In petrology the mineral clinopyroxene is used for temperature and pressure calculations of the magma that produced igneous rock containing this mineral. Clinopyroxene thermobarometry is one of several geothermobarometers. Two things make this method especially useful: first, clinopyroxene is a common phenocryst in igneous rocks easy to identify; and secondly, the crystallization of the jadeite component of clinopyroxene implies a growth in molar volume being thus a good indicator of pressure.

Thermochronometry

Publications
Most contemporary ground breaking in igneous petrology has been published in prestigious American and British scientific journals of worldwide circulation such as Science and Nature. Study material, overviews of certain topics and older works are often found as books. Many works before the plate tectonics paradigm shift in the 1960s and 1970s contains inaccurate information regarding the origin of magmas.

Notable igneous petrologists
Norman L. Bowen
Nicolas Desmarest
Louis Cordier
Harry von Eckermann
Antoine Lacroix
Akiho Miyashiro
Paul Niggli
Hans Ramberg
Jakob Sederholm
Albert Streckeisen
Marjorie Wilson
Peter John Wyllie
Lawrence Wager

References

 
Igneous rocks